Bust of a Man Wearing a Gorget and Plumed Beret is an oil-on-panel painting by Rembrandt dating to ca. 1626–27.  It measures  and is held in a private collection.  It is believed to be the earliest extant single-figure painting by Rembrandt.

The work was painted when Rembrandt was in his early twenties working in Leiden.  X-ray analysis shows that it was painted over an earlier work depicting the head of an old man.

The identity of the subject is not known, but it is believed to be a character study or "tronie" of a historical character, wearing costume – gorget and cap with feather plume – fashionable in the 15th century, possibly inspired by a woodcut print of a lansquenet.

The subject is depicted in a pose typical of Rembrandt's work, with the subject looking over the left shoulder.  It uses an exaggerated fall of light, creating bright highlights and deep shadows, perhaps inspired by Caravaggio.

The early history of the painting is not known with much certainty. It may have been held by Leo Nardus. It was sold by his daughter  before 1954, and then auctioned at Christie's in London in 1974 and acquired by Herman Shickman and Lila Shickman.

A copy of the painting was sold at Christie's in 1952.

References

1626 paintings
Paintings by Rembrandt